Adrienne Shibles is an American women's basketball coach who has been the head coach of the Dartmouth Big Green women's basketball team since 2021. Previously, she coached the Bowdoin Polar Bears women's basketball team to a 281-65 (.805) record, two New England Small College Athletic Conference championships, 11 NCAA Tournament appearances, and back-to-back NCAA Division III title game appearances. In August 2022, she was inducted into the Maine Basketball Hall of Fame.

Shibles played collegiately at Bates College in Lewiston, Maine. At Bates, she scored more than 1,000 career points.

Shibles is from Knox, Maine and graduated from Mount View High School in Thorndike, Maine.

References

Year of birth missing (living people)
Living people
People from Waldo County, Maine
Basketball players from Maine
Bates Bobcats women's basketball players
Bowdoin Polar Bears women's basketball coaches
Dartmouth Big Green women's basketball coaches
American women's basketball coaches
American women's basketball players
Basketball coaches from Maine